Tamralipto Government Medical College and Hospital (TGMCH), established in 2022, is a full-fledged tertiary referral Government medical college and hospital. This college is located at Tamluk city in Purba Medinipur district, West Bengal. This college imparts the degree Bachelor of Medicine and Surgery (MBBS) and associated degrees. This college also offers the Nursing and para-medical courses. The hospital associated with the college is one of the largest hospitals in the Purba Medinipur district.

Courses
Tamralipto Medical College and Hospital undertakes education and training of 100 students in MBBS course.

Affiliated
The college is affiliated to West Bengal University of Health Sciences and is recognised by the National Medical Commission.

References

Medical colleges in West Bengal
Affiliates of West Bengal University of Health Sciences
Universities and colleges in Purba Medinipur district
Educational institutions established in 2022